John Philpot (1516–16 January 1557) was an Archdeacon of Winchester and an English Protestant martyr whose story is recorded in Foxe's Book of Martyrs.  He was the third son of Sir Peter Philpot and was born at Compton, Hampshire, in 1516.

Education
He was educated at Winchester, where he had as a contemporary John Harpsfield, with whom he made a bet that he would write two hundred verses in one night without making more than three faults, which he did. In due course he went to New College, Oxford, where he was fellow from 1534 to 1541. He graduated B.C.L.

Clergyman
On the enactment of the Six Articles in 1539 he went abroad and travelled in various
countries. He fell into an argument with a Franciscan friar between Venice and Padua, and very narrowly escaped the inquisition in consequence. On his return he went to Winchester, where he read lectures in the cathedral, and, at some uncertain date, became archdeacon. He disagreed with his bishop, John Ponet, whom the registrary Cook, ' a man who hated pure religion' had stirred up against him. Cook even set on the archdeacon with his servants as if to murder him. When Mary came to the throne Philpot soon attracted attention. He was one who in the convocation of 1553 defended the views of the catechism, especially with reference to transubstantiation.

Imprisonment, trial and martyrdom
In 1554 he was in the King's Bench Prison, and even there he found something to dispute about, as some of his fellow prisoners were Pelagians. In October 1555 he was examined in Newgate sessions house, and, though Bishop Bonner did his best for him, he was convicted.

According to the Wikipedia version of Foxe's Book of Martyrs, he died on 16 January 1557.

Writings
Philpot wrote :

 'Vera Expositio Disputationis', an account of the proceedings in convocation, printed in Latin at Rome, 1554, and in English at Basle, and afterwards printed in Foxe's ' Actes and Monuments.'
 'Examinations', published London, 1559. Foxe published a Latin translation of this abroad, and it appears in the ' Actes and Monuments.' To one edition of this was added
 'Apologie of John Philpot' written for spitting upon an Arian; a second edition appeared the same year (1559).
 'A Supplication to Philip and Mary,' published by Foxe in the 'Actes and Monuments.'
 'Letters', also published in the 'Actes and Monuments', and separately 1564.
 'Caelius Secundus Curio : his Defence of th' Olde and Awncyent Authoritie off Christe's Churche'; this translation forms Reg. MS. 17, C. ix.
 'De Vero Christiani Sacrificio.'
 A translation of Calvin's ' Homilies.'
 'Chrysostome against Heresies.'
 'Epistolae Hebraicae' lib. i.
 'De proprietate Linguarum' lib. i.

The last five are lost. An exhortation to his sister and an oration which forms Bodl. MS. 53 are also small works. There are said to be some manuscripts written by Philpot in the library at Emmanuel College, Cambridge. All the extant works have been published, with an introduction, for the Parker Society by Robert Eden, London, 1842, 8vo.

DNB references
[Wood's Athenae Oxon. ed. Bliss, ii. 229 ; Introd. to Parker Soc. edition of Philpot's Works ; Heylyn's Ecclesia Restaurata, i. 68. &c., ii. 109, &c. ; Letters and Papers of Henry VIII, xi. 1 247, xii. pt. i. p. 340, cf. p. 430 ; Dixon's Hist, of Church of England, iv. 7–5, &c. ; Foxe's Actes and Monuments, vi. 66, &c., vii. 605, viii. 121, 171 ; Machyn's Diary (Camden Soc.), p. 98 ; Kirby's Winchester Scholars, p. 114.] W. A. J. A.

See also

 Marian Persecutions

References

1555 deaths
People educated at Winchester College
Alumni of New College, Oxford
Archdeacons of Winchester (ancient)
People executed for heresy
Executed British people
People executed under Mary I of England
Executed people from Hampshire
16th-century Protestant martyrs
1516 births
People executed by the Kingdom of England by burning
Protestant martyrs of England
16th-century Anglican theologians